Borj Ech Chemali    is a town in the  Tyre District in  South Lebanon, located just east of Tyre.

Name
According to E. H. Palmer in 1881, the name Burj esh Shemâly  means "the northern tower".

History
In 1875, Victor Guérin found the village to be  inhabited by 150  Métualis. The old fort was divided into several private dwellings.

In 1881, the PEF's Survey of Western Palestine (SWP) described it as: "A large village built of stone, containing about 300 Metawileh, placed on a low ridge, with figs, olives, and arable land around. There are two good springs nearby.

They further noted that it was "a village with a similar tower of drafted masonry (as that of Borj Rahal). The hill is crowned by a stronghold, the vaults of which, slightly ogival, do not appear older than the Crusaders, but it was constructed of older blocks, some in drafted masonry while others are completely smoothed. About a mile to the south-west of this hill is a subterranean series of tombs, each  containing several ranges of  loculi, which was explored by Renan."

References

Bibliography

External links
Borj Ech Chemali,  Localiban 
Survey of Western Palestine, Map 1:  IAA, Wikimedia commons 

Populated places in Tyre District
Shia Muslim communities in Lebanon